Emmanuel "Manos" Katrakis (14 August 1908 – 3 September 1984) was a Greek actor of theater and film.

Biography

Born in Kissamos, Cretan State, he was the youngest of five children of Haralambos Katrakis and Irini Katraki. When Manos was 10 years old, his family moved from Crete to Athens, where his father searched for work. His brother, Giannis, emigrated to North America. Manos played soccer during his youth for the Athinaikos football team and others.

Along with actor/director Kostas Leloudas, he acted in his first movie To Lavaro tou '21 in 1928. He later performed in the Ethniko Theatro (the National Theatre) in 1931. During the 1930s, he continued acting in theatrical plays (he was friends with the maestro Dimitris Mitropoulos). He married Anna Lori in 1943.

He took part in the resistance as a member of EAM/ELAS  and after refusing to sign a declaration of repentance during the Greek Civil War of 1946–49, he was exiled to Makronisos, along with such other well-known figures as Yiannis Ritsos, Nikos Koundouros, Mikis Theodorakis and Thanasis Veggos.

In the 1950s he returned to Athens from Makronisos but there was little acting work. He was handed both small and big roles in plays and films.
In 1954, he married his third and last wife named Linda Alma (real name Eleni Malioufa). Shortly before his death, he filmed his last and best movie Taxidi sta Kythira, the Journey to Kythera/Kythira, with director Theo Angelopoulos.

Death and legacy
Katrakis died at the age of 76 on 2 September 1984, from lung cancer; he had been an avid smoker for most of his life. In 2009 the Greek Post Office issued a €0,01 postage stamp in honor of Katrakis.

Selected filmography

 To Lavaro tou '21 (1929) .... Dimos
 Etsi kaneis, san agapiseis (1931)
 O Agapitikos tis voskopoulas (1932) .... Liakos
 Prosopa lismonimena (1946) .... Nikos Markidis (voice, uncredited)
 Katadromi sto Aigaion (1946) .... Lt. Cdr. Giannis Raidis
 Oi Germanoi xanarhontai... (1948) .... German soldier (uncredited)
 Marinos Kontaras (1948) .... Marinos Kontaras
 I Floga tis eleftherias (1952) .... narrator (voice)
 Eva (1953) .... Alekos
 O dromos me tis akakies (1954) .... Hristos Vranas
 Magiki polis (1954) .... Narrator
 Antigone (1961) .... Creon
 Synoikia to Oneiro (1961) .... Nekroforas
 Flogera kai aima (1961) .... Stathis Vlahopanagos
 Electra (1963) .... tutor
 Thriamvos (1962) .... Bournokos
 Enas delikanis (1963) .... father
 O Adelfos Anna (1963) .... Father Vasileios
 The red lanterns (1963) .... Kapetan Nikolas
 Athoa i enohi? (1963) .... Alekos
 Prodosia (1964) .... Professor Viktor Kastriotis
 Diogmos (1964)
 Oi Epikindynoi (1964)
 Enomenoi sti zoi kai sto thanato (1964) .... Captain Seratos
 To Bloko (1965)
 O Metanastis (1965)
 Istoria mias zois (1965) .... Mikes Papadimas
 Blood on the land (1966) .... father Hormovas
 Sparagmos (1965)
 O Epanastatis (1965)
 Katigoro tous anthropous (1966) .... Elefterios Dimitropoulos
 I Exodos tou Mesolongiou (1966)
 Dakrya gia tin Ilektra (1966) .... Tassos Petridis
 Tora pou fevgo ap' ti zoi (1966)
 Sklavoi tis moiras (1966) .... Mr. Delipetrou
 O Katatregmenos (1966) .... Labros Sarioglou
 Mazi sou, gia panta (1966)
 Erotas stin kafti ammo (1966) .... Nikolas
 Eho dikaioma na s' agapo! (1966)
 Aihmalotoi tou pepromenou (1966) .... Hristos
 Aharisti (1966)
 Kontserto gia polyvola (1967) .... General Dareios
 Ti ki an gennithika ftohos (1967) .... Mr. Razis
 O Labiris enantion ton paranomon (1967)
 To Kanoni kai t' aidoni (1968)
 I Leoforos tou misous (1968) .... Legatos
 Xerizomeni genia (1968) .... Manthos
 Tosa oneira stous dromous (1968) .... Mose Aron
 Tha kano petra tin kardia mou (1968) .... Pantelis
 Mia mera, o pateras mou (1968)
 Katigoroumeni, apologisou (1968)
 Jane Eyre (1968) .... Edward Rodgester
 I Lygeri (1968) .... Konstadis Matrozos
 I Kardia enos aliti (1968) .... Manos Sarris
 As me krinoun oi gynaikes (1968) .... Angelos Bartis
 Kynigimeni prosfygopoula (1969) .... Argyris
 Prosfygas, O (1969) .... Thanasis Daoutis
 Koureli tis zois (1969) .... Yiannis Romanis
 Kakos, psyhros ki anapodos (1969) .... Alekos Valiris
 I Thysia mias gynaikas (1969)
 I Sfragida tou Theou (1969) .... Yiannis
 I Ora tis alitheias (1969)
 I Leoforos tis prodosias (1969) .... Brig. Gen. Gerakaris
 Gia tin timi kai gia ton erota (1969) .... Pavlos
 Filise me, prin fygeis gia panta (1969) .... Stavros Karapanos
 Oratotis miden (1970) .... Horst Richter
 Aftoi pou milisan me ton thanato (1970) .... Lykourgos Venetis
 I Zougla ton poleon (1970) .... Lysias Sekeris
 To Teleftaio fili (1970)
 Ores agapis, ores polemou (1970)
 Katigoro tous dynatous (1970) .... Labros Kontarinis
 Esena mono agapo (1970) .... Vyronas Derkos
 Katahrisis exousias (1971)
 Me fovon kai pathos (1972) .... Alexandros Viaskos
 I Aliki diktator (1972) .... Eleftherios (uncredited)
 Horis syneidisi (1972) .... Kostas Dellis
 Antartes ton poleon (1972) .... Fotis's father
 Oi Prostates (1973) .... Petros Rallis
 I Fonissa (1974) .... narrator (voice)
 I Diki ton dikaston (1974) .... Theodoros Kolokotronis
 Mado mavrogenous (1974)
 Kravgi gynaikon (1978) .... Kreon
 O Ilios tou thanatou (1978) .... Papa-Giannis
 O Efialtis (1978)
 Eleftherios Venizelos (1980) .... Petros
 O Anthropos me to garyfallo (1980) .... Nikolaos Plastiras
 Voyage to Cythera (1984) .... Spyros
 Ta Hronia tis thyellas (1984) .... old man (final film role)

References

External links 
 
 Biography from creta-info.gr

1908 births
1984 deaths
20th-century Greek male actors
Greek male stage actors
Greek male film actors
Male actors from Crete
Greek Resistance members
Greek communists
Greek footballers
Athinaikos F.C. players
Recipients of the Order of George I
Burials at the First Cemetery of Athens
Deaths from lung cancer in Greece
People from Kissamos
Association footballers not categorized by position
Greek male silent film actors